Escada is a city in northeastern Brazil, in the State of Pernambuco, with 69,292 inhabitants according with IBGE 2020.

Geography

 State - Pernambuco
 Region - Zona da mata Pernambucana
 Boundaries - Cabo de Santo Agostinho and Vitória de Santo Antão  (N); Sirinhaém and Ribeirão (S);  Primavera (W);  Ipojuca  (E)
 Area - 347.2 km2
 Elevation - 109 m
 Hydrography - Ipojuca and Sirinhaém rivers
 Vegetation - Subperenifólia forest
 Climate - Hot tropical and humid
 Annual average temperature - 25 c
 Distance to Recife - 59 km

Economy

The main economic activities in Escada are based in general commerce and primary sector especially sugarcane with 384.000 tons of production in 2007.

Economic Indicators

Economy by Sector
2006

Health Indicators

References

Municipalities in Pernambuco